Goose Creek is a stream in Caldwell County of Missouri. It is a tributary of Shoal Creek.

Goose Creek was so named for the fact it was the hunting ground of geese.

See also
List of rivers of Missouri

References

Rivers of Caldwell County, Missouri
Rivers of Missouri